Erastus of Scepsis and his brother Coriscus were students of Plato.  He was also a friend of Aristotle. 

Scepsis is located about fifty kilometers from Assos in Asia Minor, to which Aristotle and Xenocrates traveled after Plato's death.

References

4th-century BC Greek people
4th-century BC philosophers
Students of Plato
Academic philosophers